Archbishop Makarios III Lyceum is a public high school located in Dasoupoli, Nicosia, Cyprus. Established in 1978, the school is named for Makarios III, the first President of Cyprus and Archbishop of the Church of Cyprus from 1950 to 1977, who is often called the Father of the Nation.

History 

Archbishop Makarios III Lyceum was established in 1978 in the Strovolos district of Nicosia. 

The school was founded to support refugees from the 1974 Turkish invasion of Cyprus. From 1978 until 1983, the school was only a gymnasium (middle school). From 1983 to 1986, it functioned as a gymnasium and a lyceum (high school). Since 1986, it has been only a lyceum. 

It is one of the largest lyceums in Nicosia, with around seven hundred students and one hundred staff each year. During the 2014–2015 academic year, the school was renovated.

Students' Activities

Publications 
The school has several student-run publications. The Student Colors magazine is the oldest publication at the school. Anazitisis is published annually at the end of the academic year, and the Dasoupolitis newspaper is published annually at the end of the first term. Dasoupolitis won prizes in Cyprus and Greece and can be found online at the school's website.

Sports 
Dasoupoli has volleyball and handball teams that have won titles in Pancyprian and nationwide tournaments. Students have also been distinguished in Olympic gymnastics, athletics, cycling and swimming.

Theatre 
Every year the school takes part in the Pancyprian School Theatre Competition. During the 11th competition, the school won first place and was selected to represent Cyprus at the Panhellenic School Games of Arts, where they won 2nd place. The play they performed was "Students" by Gregorios Xenopoulos.

International Programs 
The school has taken part in various international programs and competitions. The school has cooperated with schools in Germany and Austria through the Socrates programme. It also takes part in the Mediterranean branch of Model United Nations (MEDIMUN) and  the European Youth Parliament. It also applied to participate in the three-year Erasmus+ program.

References

High schools and secondary schools in Cyprus
Nicosia
Educational institutions established in 1978
1978 establishments in Cyprus